State Route 80 (SR 80) is an  state highway that predominantly travels in a west–east and south–north direction in the east-central part of the U.S. state of Georgia. It exists within portions of Wilkes, Warren, Glascock, Jefferson, and Burke counties. It connects the Washington area with the northern part of Burke County, via Warrenton, Wrens, and Waynesboro.

Route description
SR 80 begins at an intersection with US 78/SR 10/SR 17, southeast of Washington in Wilkes County. It heads south-southeast and crosses over the Little River at the meeting point of Wilkes, Warren, and McDuffie counties. In Cedar Rock, it intersects the western terminus of SR 223. Almost immediately is an interchange with Interstate 20 (I-20). Then, it heads southwest, passing through Camak, and heads toward Warrenton. Just before entering the city limits, it intersects the northern terminus of SR 80 Alternate (VFW Road). In town it has an intersection with US 278/SR 12/SR 80 Alternate. This intersection also marks the eastern terminus of US 278 Bypass/SR 12 Bypass. US 278 Bypass/SR 12 Bypass/SR 80 begin a concurrency around the southeast edge of town. Approximately  later, SR 80 splits off to the southeast. It intersects the western terminus of SR 17 Connector (Purvis School Road) on the Warren–Glascock county line. It passes through rural areas of Glascock County, without any major intersections, and crosses into Jefferson County. SR 80 continues to the southeast, intersecting SR 296, before meeting SR 17. The two highways head concurrently into Wrens. At the intersection with SR 102, which heads west-northwest, SR 80 departs to the east on Stapleton Highway. About two blocks later is US 1/US 221/SR 4/SR 88/SR 540 (Main Street). Here, SR 80/SR 88 head to the east. At Waynesboro Road, SR 80 splits off to the south-southeast. It travels through rural areas of the county and passes into Burke County. The route curves to the east and meets SR 305. It curves to the southeast before heading east-southeast. The highway begins a concurrency with SR 24 just before entering Waynesboro. About  later, SR 56. At the intersection with US 25/SR 121 (Liberty Street), SR 24 turns right, while SR 56/SR 80 continue through town. They meet US 25 Bypass/SR 121 Bypass. The two highways continue to the northeast, and curve to the north-northeast, before splitting. SR 80 heads northeast and intersects SR 23 in the unincorporated community of Shell Bluff. The highway continues to the northeast, until it meets its eastern terminus, an intersection with SR 56 Spur, northeast of Shell Bluff.

The only portion of SR 80 that is part of the National Highway System, a system of routes determined to be the most important for the nation's economy, mobility, and defense, is the brief concurrency with SR 17 in the Wrens area.

Major intersections

Special routes

Burke County alternate route

State Route 80 Alternate (SR 80 Alt.) was a very short-lived alternate route of SR 80 that existed in the northern part of Burke County. In 1952, it was established from SR 80 northeast of Waynesboro northeast to the shore of the Savannah River. Between January and September 1953, it was decommissioned.

Warrenton alternate route

State Route 80 Alternate (SR 80 Alt.) is a  alternate route that exists entirely within the north central part of Warren County. The southernmost portion is within the city limits of Warrenton.

It begins at an intersection with US 278/SR 12 (East Main Street), as well as US 278 Byp./SR 12 Byp./SR 80 (Legion Drive), in the east-central part of Warrenton. Starting at its southern terminus, SR 80 Alt. is concurrent with US 278/SR 12 to the east. The three highways curve to the northeast, cross over some railroad tracks of Norfolk Southern Railway, and intersect the northern terminus of Queens Way. Here, SR 80 Alt. splits off to the north-northwest on V.F.W. Road. It heads northwest and curves to a more northerly direction until it meets its eastern terminus, a second intersection with the SR 80 mainline, northeast of Warrenton.

See also

References

External links

 Georgia Roads (Routes 61 - 80)

080
Transportation in Wilkes County, Georgia
Transportation in Warren County, Georgia
Transportation in Glascock County, Georgia
Transportation in Jefferson County, Georgia
Transportation in Burke County, Georgia